John Robert Fisher (born August 22, 1946) is a Senior associate judge of the District of Columbia Court of Appeals. Prior to joining the court in 2005, Fisher was chief of the appellate division at the United States Attorney's Office for the District of Columbia for over sixteen years. Fisher received both his undergraduate and law degrees from Harvard University. In between, he served in the United States Army for two years and served a tour of duty in Vietnam. Like many District of Columbia appellate judges, coming from the U.S. Attorney's office or the Public Defender's, Judge Fisher had no experience in civil law when appointed to the Court. Fisher took senior status on August 22, 2020.

References

Sources 
 
 Interview with Hon. John Fisher, Oral History Project, Historical Society of the District of Columbia Circuit

1946 births
Living people
21st-century American judges
Assistant United States Attorneys
Harvard College alumni
Harvard Law School alumni
Judges of the District of Columbia Court of Appeals
Lawyers from Washington, D.C.
People from Fredericktown, Ohio
People from Mount Vernon, Ohio